PBSP can refer to:
Pelican Bay State Prison
Philippine Business for Social Progress
Pesso Boyden System Psychotherapy